Scalmatica is a genus of moths belonging to the family Tineidae.

Biology
One species of this genus Scalmatica albofasciella  Stainton 1859 had been found boring aerial roots of Ficus benghalensis in India and *Scalmatica corticea  Meyrick, 1925 had been reported from Vitis sp..

Species
Some species of this genus are:
Scalmatica albifusa  Meyrick, 1926
Scalmatica albofasciella  (Stainton 1859) (from India)
Scalmatica ascendens  Gozmány, 1966
Scalmatica constrata  Meyrick, 1919 (from Sri Lanka)
Scalmatica corticea  (Meyrick, 1925) (from Egypt)
Scalmatica gnathosella  Mey, 2011
Scalmatica insularis  Gozmány, 1969
Scalmatica malacista  Meyrick, 1924
Scalmatica myelodes  Meyrick, 1921
Scalmatica phaulocentra  Meyrick, 1921
Scalmatica retiaria  Meyrick, 1919
Scalmatica rhicnopa  Meyrick, 1919
Scalmatica rigens  Meyrick, 1916
Scalmatica rimosa  Meyrick, 1911
Scalmatica rimosa  Meyrick, 1911 (from Seychelles)
Scalmatica saccusella  Mey, 2011
Scalmatica separata  Gozmány, 1965
Scalmatica zernyi  Gozmány, 1967

References

Meyrick E. 1911d. Tortricina and Tineina. Results of the Percy Sladen Trust Expedition to the Indian Ocean in 1905. - Transactions of the Linnean Society of London (2)14(3):263–307.
De Prins, J. & De Prins, W. 2016. Afromoths, online database of Afrotropical moth species (Lepidoptera). World Wide Web electronic publication (www.afromoths.net) (acc.30-Dec-2016)

Myrmecozelinae
Moth genera